I Had a Love is a studio album by Ben E. King, released in 1976. "I Had a Love" and "I Betcha Didn't Know That" were released as singles. "I Had a Love" peaked at No. 23 on the Billboard Hot R&B/Hip-Hop Songs chart.

Production
"I Had a Love" was written by Valerie Simpson and Nickolas Ashford.

Track listing
"I Had a Love" (Nickolas Ashford, Valerie Simpson) - [3:37]
"I Betcha Didn't Know That" (Frederick Knight, Sam Dees) [4:46]
"Smooth Sailing" (Allan Felder) [3:18]
"No Danger Ahead" (Sam Dees) [4:11]
"Everybody Plays the Fool" (J.R. Bailey, Ken Williams, Rudy Clark) [5:21]
"Standing In the Wings of Heartache" (Clinton Moon, Sam Dees) [3:27]
"We Got Love" (Allan Felder, Bruce Gray, Norman Harris, T.G. Conway) - [3:58]
"Tower of Strength" (Bettye Crutcher, Frederick Knight, Sam Dees) [3:46]
"You're Stepping on My Heart (Tearing My World Apart)" (Gwen Guthrie, Patrick Grant) [3:45]

References

Ben E. King albums
1976 albums
Atlantic Records albums